Two fishing vessels carrying the name August Wriedt were requisioned by the Kriegsmarine during World War II.

 later served as a weather ship
 later served as a Vorpostenboot

Ship names